George Robert Lawrence Lloyd (born 11 February 2000) is an English professional footballer who plays as a forward for  club Grimsby Town, on loan from  club Cheltenham Town.

He made his first-team debut at Cheltenham Town during the 2017–18 season and spent much of the following campaign on loan at Hereford. He played 18 games for Cheltenham in the 2019–20 season, before scoring four goals in 40 games as they won promotion as champions of League Two in 2020–21. He joined Port Vale on loan for the 2021–22 season, but the loan was terminated half way through after he sustained a stomach injury. He was loaned out to Grimsby Town in January 2023.

Career

Cheltenham Town
After progressing through the academy, Lloyd made his first-team debut during Cheltenham Town's EFL Trophy tie against Swansea City U23s at Whaddon Road on 15 August 2017, which resulted in a 2–1 defeat for Cheltenham, with Lloyd featuring for the entire 90 minutes. He scored a club record-equalling eight goals in an FA Youth Cup win over A.F.C. Totton in November. He turned professional at the club in December 2017, when he was also given a League Football Education award, which was given to "highlight the achievements and progression of talented young footballers who apply themselves to all aspects of their apprenticeship". He made his League Two debut on New Years' day, coming on for Kyle Storer 79 minutes into a 4–1 defeat at Stevenage. Manager Gary Johnson handed him his first start in the English Football League on 7 April, in a 3–0 home win over Morecambe during which Lloyd picked up an assist. He scored his first goal for the "Robins" on 21 April, in a 4–3 defeat at Cambridge United. He scored another goal against Crewe Alexandra to end the 2017–18 season with two goals from eight appearances.

On 9 October 2018, Lloyd joined National League North side Hereford on a three-month loan, who were managed by former Cheltenham Town player Marc Richards. He scored his first goal for the "Bulls" during their 3–1 defeat to Boston United on 27 October. Lloyd was recalled by Cheltenham on 4 January, however was loaned back out to Hereford for the remainder of the 2018–19 season on 17 January. He scored four goals from 20 games during his time at Edgar Street before being recalled to Cheltenham for a second time on 19 February. On 13 April, he scored an equalising goal against Lincoln City, which was later voted as 'Goal of the Season' by the club's supporters. Speaking the following month, he said that "working under [manager] Michael Duff has been great for me... as someone who has come through the youth system like me here at Cheltenham I look up to him a huge amount and am looking forward to having another season working and learning from him again".

Lloyd made 18 appearances across the course of the 2019–20 campaign, scoring once in the EFL Trophy. He scored four goals from 40 games in the 2020–21 campaign as Cheltenham secured promotion into League One as champions of League Two; he started 18 league games and made 14 substitute appearances in the league. One of his goals helped to secure a 2–1 victory over Crewe Alexandra in the second round of the FA Cup, with his header earning him plaudits from Duff for his bravery.

On 30 August 2021, Lloyd joined League Two side Port Vale on a season-long loan deal, after already playing six times for Cheltenham earlier in the month. Manager Darrell Clarke said: "he's a striker that optimises what I want in my centre-forwards, he works hard, he's a grafter". Limited to only one league start and five substitute appearances in his first two months with the "Valiants", assistant manager Andy Crosby nevertheless stated that "George impressed us from the day he walked into the football club with his enthusiasm, his endeavour and his willingness to run, chase, harry and upset defenders". He scored his first goal for the club in a 5–1 victory over Accrington Stanley in an FA Cup first round match on 6 November. However he was sidelined with a stomach injury at the end of the month and was prescribed three months of complete rest in order to recover. On 13 January 2022, his loan was terminated and he returned to Cheltenham Town. He started three games and made five substitute appearances for Cheltenham in the second half of the 2021–22 season, scoring a goal against AFC Wimbledon upon his return to fitness.

He made thirteen League One appearances in the first half of the 2022–23 season, including six starts under new head coach Wade Elliott, though struggled to find regular gametime due to the form of Alfie May and Dan Nlundulu. On 31 January 2023, Lloyd joined League Two side Grimsby Town on loan for the remainder of the 2022–23 season as manager Paul Hurst looked to add options to his front line. He scored on his debut four days later in a 3–0 win away at Crewe Alexandra.

Style of play
Lloyd is a brave and hard-working forward who can also play wide on the right or as an advanced midfielder. Writing in January 2023, Gloucestershire Live reporter Jon Palmer described him as a "genuine all-rounder" due to his athleticism. heading skills and pace.

Career statistics

Honours
Cheltenham Town
EFL League Two: 2020–21

References

2000 births
Living people
Footballers from Gloucester
English footballers
Association football forwards
Cheltenham Town F.C. players
Hereford F.C. players
Port Vale F.C. players
Grimsby Town F.C. players
English Football League players
National League (English football) players